Frizzle may refer to:
Frizzle (chicken plumage), a domestic chicken plumage pattern featuring curled feathers
Frizzle chicken (breed), a specific breed of domestic chicken featuring the frizzle plumage pattern
Ms. Frizzle, a character in The Magic School Bus
To fry (food)

See also
Frizzle Fry, an album by Primus
Frizzle Sizzle, a Dutch musical group
Frizzled, a family of proteins